Bonellia is a genus of polychaetes belonging to the family Bonelliidae.

The genus has almost cosmopolitan distribution.

Species:

Bonellia minor 
Bonellia pacifica 
Bonellia pilosa 
Bonellia plumosa 
Bonellia pumicea 
Bonellia sabulosa 
Bonellia suhmii 
Bonellia thomensis 
Bonellia viridis

References

Polychaetes